Norton Woodseats F.C. was an English association football club from Sheffield, South Yorkshire, but based for most of their existence in Dronfield, Derbyshire.

History
Formed in 1912, in their early years the club competed in local Sheffield leagues before entering the Sheffield Amateur League and then the Sheffield Association League, winning the latter in 1928. They entered the FA Amateur Cup for the first time in 1926 and the FA Cup a year later. They won the Association League again in 1938, and a year later reached the semi-finals of the Amateur Cup, losing to Willington at Ayresome Park in Middlesbrough.

After the Second World War the club joined the Yorkshire League, gaining promotion to Division 1 in 1950. They finished as high as league runners-up in 1955, but were relegated back to Division 2 in 1964. Although they won promotion back to the Yorkshire League's top flight after two seasons, they struggled in the lower echelons of Division 1 for four years before being relegated again.

In 1974 they were relegated to Division 3, but won promotion back to Division 2 at the first time of asking, and when the Yorkshire League merged with the Midland League to form the Northern Counties East League in 1982, Norton Woodseats were accepted into the new competition. They remained members of the NCEL until 1991 (being known as Dronfield United from 1984 to 1991), when they resigned from the league. A year later they joined the Central Midlands League before resigning from this league too after just three years and disbanding. Although the club was reformed to enter the Sheffield & Hallamshire County Senior Football League in 1994, the club was on its last legs, and dissolved for good in 1999.

Notable former players
Players that played in the Football League either before or after being with Norton Woodseats –

 Wilfred Adey
 Cec Coldwell
 David Frain
 Harry Gooney
 Howard Johnson
 Ben Shearman

League and cup history

Honours

League
Yorkshire League Division One
Runners-up: 1954–55Yorkshire League Division Two
Promoted: 1950–51, 1965–66 (champions)
Yorkshire League Division Three
Promoted: 1974–75Sheffield Association LeagueChampions: 1927–28, 1937–38Sheffield & Hallamshire County Senior League Division 2Champions: 1998–99

CupSheffield & Hallamshire Senior Cup'''
Winners: 1937–38
Runners-up: 1943–44, 1966–67, 1967–68

Records
Best FA Cup performance: 4th Qualifying Round, 1948–49, 1957–58
Best FA Amateur Cup performance: Semi-final, 1938–39
Best FA Vase performance: 4th Round, 1980–81

References

Defunct football clubs in England
Defunct football clubs in South Yorkshire
Dronfield
Sheffield Association League
Yorkshire Football League
Sheffield Amateur League
Northern Counties East Football League
Central Midlands Football League
Sheffield & Hallamshire County Senior Football League
Defunct football clubs in Derbyshire
Association football clubs established in 1912
Association football clubs disestablished in 1999